This is a list of Iranian football transfers for the 2018 summer transfer window. Transfers of Iran Pro League are listed. Transfer window was opened on June 13, 2018, and will be open until September 4, 2018, for players who played in Iranian clubs.

Rules and regulations 
According to Iran Football Federation rules for 2018–19 Iran Pro League, each Football Club is allowed to take up to maximum 6 new Iranian player from the other clubs who already played in the 2017–18 Iran Pro League season. In addition to these six new players, each club is allowed to take up to maximum 4 non-Iranian new players (at least one of them should be Asian) and up to 3 players from Free agent (who did not play in 2018–19 Iran Pro League season or doesn't list in any 2018–19 League after season's start) during the season. In addition to these players, the clubs are also able to take some new under-23 and under-21 years old players, if they have some free place in these categories in their player lists. Under-23 players should sign in transfer window but under-21 can be signed during the first mid-season. On 5 July 2018, a new rule was confirmed by Iran Football Federation which allows the clubs to move up to three players into their under-25 years old players list. These under-25 years old players must be under contract of the club in the previous season.

Players limits
The Iranian Football Clubs who participate in 2018–19 Iranian football different levels are allowed to have up to maximum 45 players in their player lists, which will be categorized in the following groups:
 Up to maximum 18 adult (without any age limit) players
 Up to maximum 3 under-25 players (i.e. the player whose birth is after 1 January 1994).
 Up to maximum 9 under-23 players (i.e. the player whose birth is after 1 January 1996).
 Up to maximum 15 under-21 players (i.e. the player whose birth is after 1 January 1998).

Iran Pro League

Esteghlal 
Manager:  Winfried Schäfer

In

Out

Esteghlal Khuzestan 
Manager: N/A

In

Out

Foolad 
Manager:  Sirous Pourmousavi

In

Out

Gostaresh Foulad 
Manager:  Firouz Karimi

In

Out

Naft Masjed-Soleyman 
Manager:  Mahmoud Fekri

In

Out

Nassaji 
Manager:  Javad Nekounam

In

Out

Padideh 
Manager:  Yahya Golmohammadi

In

Out

Pars Jonoubi Jam 
Manager:  Mehdi Tartar

In

Out

Paykan 
Manager:  Majid Jalali

In

Out

Persepolis 
Manager:  Branko Ivanković

In

Out

Saipa 
Manager:  Ali Daei

In

Out

Sanat Naft 
Manager:  Paulo Sérgio

In

Out

Sepahan 
Manager:  Amir Ghalenoei

In

Out

Sepidrood 
Manager: Khodadad Azizi

In

Out

Tractor 
Manager:  John Toshack

In

Out

Zob Ahan 
Manager:  Omid Namazi

In

Out

Notes and references

Football transfers summer 2018
2018
Transfers